The 2017 World Junior Ice Hockey Championship Division I was played in two groups of six teams each. In each group the first-placed team is promoted to a higher level, while the last-placed team is relegated to a lower level.  Divisions I A and I B represent the second and the third tier of the IIHF World U20 Championship.  To be eligible as a "junior" a player couldn't be born earlier than 1997.

Division I A
The Division I A tournament was played in Bremerhaven, Germany, from 11 to 17 December 2016.

Participants

Final standings

Results
All times are local (UTC+1).

Statistics

Top 10 scorers

source:IIHF

Goaltending leaders
(minimum 40% team's total ice time)

source:IIHF

Awards

Best Players Selected by the Directorate
 Goaltender:  Mirko Pantkowski
 Defenceman:  Pavel Vorobei
 Forward:  Andrei Belevich

Division I B
The Division I B tournament was played in Budapest, Hungary, from 11 to 17 December 2016.

Participants

Final standings

Results
All times are local (UTC+1).

Statistics

Top 10 scorers

GP = Games played; G = Goals; A = Assists; Pts = Points; +/− = Plus-minus; PIM = Penalties In Minutes
Source: IIHF.com

Goaltending leaders
(minimum 40% team's total ice time)

Source: IIHF.com

Awards

Best Players Selected by the Directorate
 Goaltender:  Mark Vlahovic
 Defenceman:  Bence Stipsicz
 Forward:  Alan Lyszczarczyk

References

External links
IIHF.com

I
World Junior Ice Hockey Championships – Division I
International ice hockey competitions hosted by Germany
International ice hockey competitions hosted by Hungary
Bremerhaven
International sports competitions in Budapest
December 2016 sports events in Europe
2016–17 in German ice hockey
2016–17 in Hungarian ice hockey